William Paul Mlkvy (born January 19, 1931) is a retired American professional basketball player who spent his one-year career with the Philadelphia Warriors (now the Golden State Warriors). Philadelphia selected Mlkvy with a territorial pick of the 1952 NBA draft out of Temple University.

A 6'4" (1.93 m) and 190 lb (86 kg) forward, he was nicknamed "The Owl without a Vowel." His parents, John and Margaret, migrated to the United States in 1907 from present-day Slovakia, then part of the Austro-Hungarian Empire, when his father got a job with The New Jersey Zinc Company. Mlkvy is one of eight children.

After being drafted, Mlkvy continued with his schooling, attending Temple's dental school while playing with the Warriors. After his rookie season, Warriors general manager and coach Eddie Gottlieb made Mlkvy choose between school and basketball. Mlkvy initially chose basketball but changed course when he was informed that he would be drafted into the United States Army as a private if he was no longer enrolled in school but, if he finished school, he would be drafted as a dental officer.

Mlkvy finished dental school the following year and enlisted in the Army as a dentist and served for six years, eventually reaching the rank of major and serving in the Korean War.

In 1992, Mlkvy was inducted into the Pennsylvania Sports Hall of Fame.

See also

List of NCAA Division I men's basketball players with 60 or more points in a game
List of NCAA Division I men's basketball season scoring leaders

References

External links
http://www.basketball-reference.com/players/m/mlkvybi01.html

1931 births
Living people
All-American college men's basketball players
United States Army personnel of the Korean War
American dentists
American men's basketball players
American people of Slovak descent
Basketball players from Pennsylvania
People from Carbon County, Pennsylvania
Philadelphia Warriors draft picks
Philadelphia Warriors players
Small forwards
Temple Owls men's basketball players
United States Army officers
Military personnel from Pennsylvania